He Ting Ru (born 16 June 1983) is a Singaporean politician and lawyer. A member of the opposition Workers' Party (WP), she has been the Member of Parliament (MP) representing the Buangkok division of Sengkang GRC since 2020.

During the 2020 general election, she led the four-member WP team to another historic breakthrough when her team won the second Group Representation Constituency (GRC).

Early life
He attended CHIJ Saint Nicholas Girls' School and Raffles Junior College before graduating from the University of Cambridge with a Bachelor of Arts degree in natural sciences. After graduating from university, she completed the Graduate Diploma in Law and Legal Practice Course, qualifying as a lawyer in the jurisdiction of England and Wales.

Political career 

He began volunteering with the Workers' Party (WP) in the Paya Lebar division in 2011. 

She made her political debut in the 2015 general election as part of the five-member WP team contesting in Marine Parade GRC where the team garnered 35.9% of the votes and lost to the PAP team there, including Tan Chuan Jin and Emeritus Senior Minister Goh Chok Tong.

She previously served as Secretary of the Workers' Party Youth Wing, and oversees the youth wing's outreach efforts in the areas of service, education and heritage.

During the 2020 general election, He led a four-member WP team contesting in Sengkang GRC. On 11 July, she was elected as the Member of Parliament (MP) representing the Buangkok division of Sengkang GRC.

She was elected to the party's Central Executive Committee (CEC) as Treasurer.

Legal career
Since 2013, He Ting Ru has been Head of Legal and Communications of a listed multinational company which oversees legal and communications matters in Asia, North America, Europe and Africa.

She was trained at and worked as a solicitor at the law firm Clifford Chance, working in London and Frankfurt, before joining a European financial institution in Singapore as a derivatives lawyer.

Personal life 
She married Terence Tan, a fellow WP member in 2016. The couple were part of the five-member WP team contesting Marine Parade GRC in 2015. They have three sons.

References

External links
 He Ting Ru on Parliament of Singapore

Workers' Party (Singapore) politicians
Singaporean politicians of Chinese descent
Raffles Junior College alumni
Living people
Alumni of the University of Cambridge
CHIJ Saint Nicholas Girls' School alumni
21st-century Singaporean lawyers
Singaporean women lawyers
Singaporean women in politics
Members of the Parliament of Singapore
1983 births